Shelby is an unincorporated community located in the town of Shelby, La Crosse County, Wisconsin, United States.

History
The community was named for the first governor of Kentucky Isaac Shelby. The first raising of the American flag in Wisconsin occurred in this community when the fort located here was taken from the British.

Notes

Unincorporated communities in La Crosse County, Wisconsin
Unincorporated communities in Wisconsin